Sandhya Agarwal (born 9 May 1963) is a former captain of the Indian women's cricket team.  She hails from Indore.

Career 
She played in 13 Test matches from 1984 to 1995, scoring 1110 runs at a batting average of 50.45, including 4 centuries.  She reached her top score of 190 against England in 1986, beating Betty Snowball's score of 189 that had held the record in women's Test cricket since 1935.  However, her mark was passed by Denise Annetts, who scored 193 in 1987.

She also played in 21 Women's ODIs, scoring 567 runs at an average of 31.50.

Her major teams included Indian women's cricket team and the Railways women's cricket team.

Test centuries

Post retirement 
After her retirement, Agarwal continued to contribute to cricket as a selector and coach. She is chairperson of girl's U-19 and senior women's team of MPCA as well as a member of the BCCI's women's committee.

In 2017, Agarwal was offered the honorary life membership by The Marylebone Cricket Club, one of the most active cricket clubs that also own Lord's Ground and the guardian of the laws of the game. Agarwal was being honoured in recognition of her distinguished services to cricket.

See also 
 List of centuries in women's Test cricket

References

1961 births
India women One Day International cricketers
India women Test cricketers
Indian women cricket captains
Living people
Madhya Pradesh women cricketers
Railways women cricketers
Recipients of the Arjuna Award
Cricketers from Indore
20th-century Indian women
20th-century Indian people
Sportswomen from Madhya Pradesh